Movement For Peace is a global movement led by Suhaib Saqib, that raises awareness and engages the global community with issues relating to peace, counter-extremism, human rights, justice and education.

History
Movement For Peace was founded in 2013. In 2015, the founder, Suhaib Saqib, at the age of 17, was nominated for the International Children's Peace Prize.

See also
 Anti-war movement
 Peace movement

References

 Gang rape of toddler in India just one incident of many in the past week alone, activists say Independent. 19 October 2015. Retrieved 1 June 2016.
 MPs recognise teenager's campaign for world peace. BBC. 11 February 2014. Retrieved 1 June 2016.
 Derby teenager Suhaib Saqib's peace campaign wins praise from 15 MPs. Derby Telegraph. 3 February 2014. Retrieved 1 June 2016.
 Derby student who leads movement for world peace condemns Pakistan terrorism. Derby Telegraph. 23 December 2014. Retrieved 1 June 2016. Archived from the original 5 October 2015.
 Derby schoolboy Suhaib Saqib urges world unity to thwart terrorist outrages such as Charli Hebdo. Derby Telegraph. 12 January 2015. Retrieved 1 June 2016. Archived from the original 6 October 2015.

External links
  Movement For Peace Website

Human rights organisations based in the United Kingdom
Peace movement in the United Kingdom